is a 2013 Japanese film directed by Yūzou Asahara, starring Aya Ueto.

Cast
Aya Ueto as Funaki Haru
Kengo Kora as Funaki Yasunobu
Toshiyuki Nishida as Funaki Den'nai
Kimiko Yo as Funaki Mitsu
Yui Natsukawa
Riko Narumi
Tasuku Emoto
Manabu Ino as Maeda Yoshinori
Naoto Ogata as Ōtsuki Denzō
Takeshi Kaga as Maeda Naomi

References

External links

 

Samurai films
2013 films
Films directed by Yūzou Asahara
Films scored by Taro Iwashiro
2010s Japanese films